The 2019 Montreal Impact season was the club's 26th season of existence, and their 8th in Major League Soccer, the top tier of the Canadian soccer pyramid.

Squad
Source, As of September 23, 2019:

International roster slots 
Montreal has ten MLS International Roster Slots for use in the 2018 season. Montreal has eight slots allotted from the league and the team acquired three spots in trades with the Columbus Crew SC, Colorado Rapids and FC Cincinnati.

Player Movement

In 
Per Major League Soccer and club policies terms of the deals do not get disclosed.

Out

Loans in

Loans out

Draft picks

International caps 
Players called for senior international duty during the 2019 season while under contract with the Montreal Impact.

Friendlies

Review

Montreal Impact had a successful Pre-Season time, winning over Nashville, Philadelphia, D.C. United and tying versus Cincinnati and Tampa Bay Rowdies.

Pre-Season

Major League Soccer

Review

March
On March 2, Montreal Impact defeated San Jose Earthquakes in their first Major League Soccer match with a score of 2 to 1, Piatti and Taïder scoring for Montreal.
Montreal Impact lost their second regular season match versus Houston Dynamo.
On March 16, Montreal's Zakaria Diallo received a late red card versus Orlando City for pushing Dom Dwyer in a 3-1 win.

Tables

Eastern Conference

Overall

Results summary

Results by round

Matches
Unless otherwise noted, all times in EST

Canadian Championship

Bracket

Canadian Championship results

Third qualifying round

Semi-final

Final

Statistics

Appearances, Minutes Played, and Goals Scored

Top scorers

{| class="wikitable sortable alternance"  style="font-size:85%; text-align:center; line-height:14px; width:85%;"
|-
!width=10|Rank
!width=10|Nat.
! scope="col" style="width:275px;"|Player
!width=10|Pos.
!width=80|MLS
!width=80|Canadian Champ
!width=80|MLS Playoffs
!width=80|TOTAL
|-
|1||  || Saphir Taïder                || MF ||9 ||1 || || 10
|-
|2||  || Orji Okwonkwo                || FW ||8 || || || 8
|-
|3||  || Ignacio Piatti                || MF ||3 ||4 || || 7
|-
|4||  || Lassi Lappalainen                || FW ||5 || || || 5
|-
|5||  || Anthony Jackson-Hamel                || FW ||3 ||1 || || 4
|-
|5||  || Maximiliano Urruti                || FW ||4 || || || 4
|-
|7|| || Omar Browne                || FW ||2 ||1 || || 3
|-
|7||  || Zakaria Diallo                || DF ||3 || || || 3
|-
|7||  || Bojan Krkić                || FW ||3 || || || 3
|-
|10||  || Shamit Shome                || MF ||1 || || || 1
|-
|10|| || Harry Novillo               || FW ||1 || || || 1
|-
|10|| || Rudy Camacho                || DF ||1 || || || 1
|-
|10|| || Bacary Sagna                || DF ||1 || || || 1
|-
|- class="sortbottom"
| colspan="4"|Totals|| 43 || 7 ||0 ||50

Italic: denotes player left the club during the season.

Top Assists 

{| class="wikitable sortable alternance"  style="font-size:85%; text-align:center; line-height:14px; width:85%;"
|-
!width=10|Rank
!width=10|Nat.
! scope="col" style="width:275px;"|Player
!width=10|Pos.
!width=80|MLS
!width=80|Canadian Champ
!width=80|MLS Playoffs
!width=80|TOTAL
|-
|1||  || Saphir Taïder                || MF ||7 ||2 || || 9
|-
|2||  || Maximiliano Urruti                || FW ||6 ||1 || || 7
|-
|3||  || Bacary Sagna                || DF ||3 ||1 || || 4
|-
|4||  || Daniel Lovitz                || DF ||2 || || || 2
|-
|4||  || Omar Browne                || MF ||2 || || || 2
|-
|4||  || Harry Novillo                || FW ||2 || || || 2
|-
|4||  || Zakaria Diallo                || DF ||2 || || || 2
|-
|4||  || Clément Bayiha                || MF ||1 ||1 || || 2
|-
|4||  || Orji Okwonkwo                || FW ||2 || || || 2
|-
|9||  || Micheal Azira                || MF ||1 || || || 1
|-
|9||  || Shamit Shome                || MF ||1 || || || 1
|-
|9||  || Ignacio Piatti                || MF ||1 || || || 1
|-
|9||  || Zachary Brault-Guillard                || DF ||1 || || || 1
|-
|9||  || Mathieu Choinière                || MF ||1 || || || 1
|-
|9||  || Jorge Corrales                || DF ||1 || || || 1
|-
|9||  || Lassi Lappalainen                || FW ||1 || || || 1
|-
|- class="sortbottom"
| colspan="4"|Totals|| 33 || 5 ||0 ||38

Italic: denotes player left the club during the season.

Goals Against Average 

{| border="1" cellpadding="4" cellspacing="0" style="margin: 1em 1em 1em 1em 0; background: #f9f9f9; border: 1px #aaa solid; border-collapse: collapse; font-size: 95%; text-align: center;"
|-
| rowspan="2" style="width:1%; text-align:center;"|No.
| rowspan="2" style="width:90px; text-align:center;"|Nat.
| rowspan="2" style="width:25%; text-align:center;"|Player
| colspan="3" style="text-align:center;"|Total
| colspan="3" style="text-align:center;"|Major League Soccer
| colspan="3" style="text-align:center;"|Canadian Championship
| colspan="3" style="text-align:center;"|MLS Playoffs
|-
|MIN
|GA
|GAA
|MIN
|GA
|GAA
|MIN
|GA
|GAA
|MIN
|GA
|GAA
|-
| style="text-align: right;" |1
|
| style="text-align: left;" |Evan Bush
|2880
|59
|1.84
|2880
|59
|1.84
|0
|0
|0.00
|0
|0
|0.00
|-
| style="text-align: right;" |23
|
| style="text-align: left;" |Clément Diop
|540
|4
|0.67
|180
|1
|0.50
|360
|3
|0.75
|0
|0
|0.00
|-
| style="text-align: right;" |41
|
| style="text-align: left;" |James Pantemis
|180
|1
|0.50
|0
|0
|0.00
|180
|1
|0.50
|0
|0
|0.00

Italic: denotes player left the club during the season.

Clean sheets 

{| class="wikitable sortable alternance"  style="font-size:85%; text-align:center; line-height:14px; width:85%;"
|-
!width=10|No.
!width=10|Nat.
! scope="col" style="width:225px;"|Player
!width=80|MLS
!width=80|Canadian Championship
!width=80|MLS Cup Playoffs
!width=80|TOTAL
|-
|1||  || Evan Bush                     || 7|| ||   ||7
|-
|23||  || Clément Diop               || 1 || 2||   ||3
|-
|41||  || James Pantemis               ||  || 1||   ||1
|- class="sortbottom"
| colspan="3"|Totals|| 8 || 3 ||0  || 11

Top minutes played 

{| class="wikitable sortable alternance"  style="font-size:85%; text-align:center; line-height:14px; width:80%;"
|-
!width=10|No.
!width=10|Nat.
!scope="col" style="width:275px;"|Player
!width=10|Pos.
!width=80|MLS
!width=80|Canadian Champ
!width=80|TOTAL
|-
|8||  || Saphir Taïder                || MF || 2728 || 305 || 3033
|-
|37 ||  || Maximiliano Urruti             || FW || 2436 || 481  || 2917
|-
|1 ||  || |Evan Bush                   || GK || 2880 ||      || 2880
|-
|33||  || Bacary Sagna              || DF || 2180 || 450  || 2630
|-
|3||  || Daniel Lovitz                 || DF || 2520 || 181  || 2601
|-
|6||  || Samuel Piette               || MF || 2220 ||  355  || 2575
|-
|22||  || Jukka Raitala        || DF || 2083 || 369  || 2452
|-
|5||  || Zakaria Diallo          || DF || 2037 || 180  || 2217
|-
|28||  || Shamit Shome              || MF || 1627  || 329 || 1956
|-
|4||  || Rudy Camacho      || DF || 1464 || 450 || 1914
|-

Italic: denotes player left the club during the season.

Yellow and red cards

Recognition

MLS Player of the Week

MLS Goal of the Week

MLS Team of the Week

References

CF Montréal seasons
Montreal Impact
Montreal Impact
Montreal Impact